Califfi Castle is a 17th-century castle on the Croatian island of Ugljan (Dalmatia), located in the town of the same name. The castle was built by the Califfi family in the 17th century. The Bercich (in Croatian Berčić or Brčić) family from Zara - Zadar acted as stewards of the castle, and the castle eventually took on their name. More recently the castle has been restored and carries the name Dvor Krešimir Ćosić after the former Croatian basketball star.

References 

Castles in Croatia
Ugljan
Buildings and structures in Zadar County